Qin Hailu (born 11 August 1978) is a Chinese actress, screenwriter and singer. She has won Best Actress at the Golden Horse Film Festival and Awards, Hong Kong Film Critics Society Award and Golden Bauhinia Awards.

Early life and education
Born with a movie projectionist father and an amateur actress mother, Qin learned to dance at the local Children's Palace when she was still a young child. At the age of 6, she was sent to a Peking Opera school in Yingkou, spending the next ten years training in a strict and harsh environment. She joined a local Peking opera theatre after completing her training. After working for a few years, Qin decided to audition for the Central Academy of Traditional Opera. Though she was late for the auditions, Chang Li, the teacher in charge of recruiting, who later became her instructor, saw for herself Qin's talents and offered her another chance. Yet, only after she had finished all of the tests, did Qin learn that she was at the Central Academy of Drama instead of at the National Academy of Chinese Theatre Arts, and enrolled into the school. In 1999, not long before graduation, Qin was cast by Fruit Chan in her first film.

Career
Qin is best known for her role in the film Durian Durian (2000) by Fruit Chan, which portrays the experiences of a young girl and her sex worker neighbor in Hong Kong. The film won the Best Picture award at the 38th Taiwan's Golden Horse Awards, and Qin won the Best Actress and Best New Performer awards.

Thereafter, Qin starred in Yip Wai Man's film Everlasting Love (2002) with Hong Kong actor Daniel Chan. In the film, Qin plays a country girl who meets and falls in love with a young doctor (played by Chan) who is working for the United Nations. Despite much effort, the film failed to gain much attention and was not well received in theaters. Also in 2002, Qin starred in the film Chicken Poets by Chinese musical director Meng Jinghuai. In the film, Qin plays a colorblind country girl, who dreams of leaving her village in search of a new life.

Qin starred in arthouse comedy The Piano in a Factory (2011) by Zhang Meng, offering to work without pay and supporting the film in post-production work. The film won plautis from critics and film makers, and numerous awards, including the Best Actress award at the China Movie Channel Media Awards for Qin. Qin also co-wrote and starred in the Taiwanese drama film Return Ticket (2011), based on a true story of a group of village women who rented a bus to go home for the holidays; which won the Best Original Screenplay award at the Golden Horse Awards.

Aside from films and dramas, Qin has also participated in numerous stage plays; including Red Rose and White Rose (2010), Four Generations Under One Roof (2012), and Green Snake (2013). In 2012, she won the Outstanding Actress at the China Golden Lion Award for Drama, the highest honor awarded for theater play, for her performance in Four Generations Under One Roof.

Qin starred alongside Zhou Xun in Red Sorghum (2014), based on Nobel laureate Mo Yan's 1986 novel of the same name. She was awarded the Best Supporting Actress at the Shanghai Television Festival for her performance. According to the jury, Qin was able to "handle well her role and figure with a characteristic artistic image."

In 2017, Qin launched her upcoming directorial debut Go It Alone at the Asian New Talent Award.

Filmography

Film

Television series

Discography

Albums

Awards and nominations

References

External links

21st-century Chinese actresses
Actresses from Liaoning
Living people
1978 births
Chinese stage actresses
Chinese film actresses
Chinese television actresses
Chinese women screenwriters
People from Yingkou
Central Academy of Drama alumni
21st-century Chinese women singers
Screenwriters from Liaoning
Singers from Liaoning